Beth Kustan is a village in Mardin Province in southeastern Turkey. It is located in the Midyat District and the historical region of Tur Abdin. Beth Kustan is inhabited by Assyrians who belong to the Syriac Orthodox Church and speak Turoyo, a dialect of Neo-Aramaic. 
 
In the village, there are churches of Mor Dimet and Mor Eliyo.

The village had a population of 153 in 2021.

Etymology
The Syriac name of the village is derived from "beth" ("house" in Syriac) and "Kustan" ("Constantine" in Syriac), thus Beth Kustan translates to "house of Constantine".

History
The church of Mor Eliyo was constructed in 343 AD. It is suggested that the village was founded by a member of the Roman limitanei (frontier militia) named Constans in the 4th century AD.  

At the onset of the Assyrian genocide, in 1915, Haco, agha (chief) of the Kurtak tribe, warned the villagers of an impending attack by Turkish and Kurdish soldiers. Despite initial hesitation, upon receiving news of the massacre of Assyrians at Zaz, all but two villagers fled to the neighbouring village of Hah. Beth Kustan was subsequently ransacked by Kurdish soldiers, and the two remaining villagers were killed. The Assyrians resisted Kurdish and Turkish attacks at Hah until a truce was negotiated by Haco, but were not able to leave until Çelebi, agha of the Heverkan tribe, helped them to return to Beth Kustan in 1922.

The village was officially named Alagöz in the 1930s as a result of the state's turkification policy. Most of the village's population were forced to leave in the 1960s and 1970s due to the Kurdish–Turkish conflict and emigrated abroad to the Netherlands, Germany, and Switzerland. In 1993, it was alleged that seven villagers were detained and tortured by Turkish paramilitaries.  On 12 February 2015, Beth Kustan was restored as the official name of the village.

Demography
The following is a list of the number of families that have inhabited Beth Kustan per year stated. Unless otherwise stated, all figures are from the list provided in Eastern Christianity, Theological Reflection on Religion, Culture, and Politics in the Holy Land and Christian Encounter with Islam and the Muslim World, as noted in the bibliography below.

1900: 
1966: 155
1978: 73
1979: 62
1981: 63
1987: 30
1995: 15
1997: 17
2013: 15–23
2021: 15

The following is a list of the number of people that have inhabited Beth Kustan per year stated. Unless otherwise stated, all figures are provided from the Turkish Statistical Institute.

2013: 144
2014: 145
2015: 150
2016: 153
2017: 164
2018: 174
2019: 167
2020: 162
2021: 153

Notable people
Gabriel of Beth Qustan (573/574–648), Syriac Orthodox Bishop of Tur Abdin
Timotheos Samuel Aktaş (b. 1945), Syriac Orthodox Archbishop of Tur Abdin.

References
Notes

Citations

Bibliography

Assyrian communities in Turkey
Tur Abdin
Villages in Midyat District
Places of the Assyrian genocide
Populated places in ancient Upper Mesopotamia